Story In New York is the 4.5 studio album by SG Wannabe.

Music video
Two versions of the music video for "First Snow". SG Wannabe member, Chae Dong Ha, was featured as the male lead in the music video. The other two members, Kim Yong Yun and Kim Jin Ho were also featured in the music video.

A music video for "A Christmas Story" was also released and featured all three SG Wannabe members.

Notable tracks

"Three Letters"
"Three Letters" originally appeared in Princess Lulu OST in 2005 and was performed by M to M.

"First Snow"
"First Snow" is the title track of this album.

"A Christmas Story"
"A Christmas Story" is a nice mellow ballad track.

Track listing

References

SG Wannabe albums
Stone Music Entertainment albums
2007 albums